Sikhism in Greater Vancouver, is one of the main religions across the region, especially among the Indo-Canadian population. The Sikh community in Vancouver is the oldest, largest and most influential across Canada, having begun in the late 19th century.

By 1995, Vancouver had one of the two largest Sikh populations in the world that are not in India. In 2003, the Sikhs became the largest group in Greater Vancouver who did not practice Christianity. In 2011, there were 155,945 Sikhs in Greater Vancouver, representing 6.8% of the region's population.

As of 2021, the Sikh population in Metro Vancouver is 222,165, forming 8.5% of the total regional population.

Hugh Johnston, the author of "The Development of the Punjabi Community in Vancouver since 1961," wrote that "Sikhs are exclusively Punjabi".

History

At the turn of the century the Mayor of Vancouver did not permit cremation, so when the first Sikh died in 1907 he could not be cremated in the Vancouver city limits. Christian missionaries did not permit him to be buried with whites. Even though the missionaries promoted burial, the Sikhs instead cremated the man in a distant wilderness. This prompted Sikhs to establish their own religious institutions.

Beginning in the 1930s, within the Vancouver area, many clean-shaven or sahajdhari Sikhs began hanging up their hats and entering the gurdwaras with uncovered heads; this practice was like men removing hats before attending Christian churches. Turbanned or kesdhari Sikhs objected to this practice.

Until the 1960s Sikh religious organizations were the primary political interest groups of the Indo-Canadian community in the Vancouver region. At that time there were three gurdwaras in Metro Vancouver: the two Khalsa Diwan Society (KDS) gurdwaras in Vancouver and New Westminster and the Akali Singh gurdwara in Vancouver. The political structure of the Sikh community began to shift in the early 1970s since newcomers to politics began vying for influence against established political leaders as immigration increased the size of the community. In 1981 there were 22,392 Sikhs in Vancouver, virtually all of them being ethnic Punjabi. That year, Dusenbery wrote that the maturation of Punjabi Sikhs who were children of immigrants, the increase in immigration, and the rise of gora (White) Sikh converts from Canada and the United States changed the character of the Vancouver Sikh community in the period 1971-1981. Several turbanned Sikhs began criticizing the practice of entering gurdwaras with uncovered heads in the 1970s. By 1977, Vancouver's Sikh community, along with that of the Greater Toronto Area, were one of the two largest Canadian Sikh communities.

Organizations that favored the establishment of Khalistan began assuming control of Greater Vancouver gurdwaras after Operation Bluestar occurred in 1984. In 1988 Hugh Johnston wrote that in regards to the city's Punjabi community, "being Punjabi is coming to mean, exclusively, being Sikh", and that "it seems likely that Punjabi culture" in Vancouver would be exclusively "an aspect of Sikh identity" and exclude Hindus, who disagreed on the Khalistan issue.

Around 1995 moderate Sikhs politically challenged more extremist Sikhs in gurdwaras in Vancouver and Surrey. A December 1996 attack on the Guru Nanak temple in Surrey led by extremists and a January 1997 fight occurred.

Varieties of Sikhism
In 1988 Hugh Johnston wrote that there are political divisions and religious divisions within the Sikh community of Vancouver. In 2008 Elizabeth Kamala Nayar, the author of "Misunderstood in the Diaspora," stated that Vancouver media reporting on orthodox Sikhs is often negative and that orthodox Sikhs "are portrayed negatively as ‘backward’ and ‘violent’". She also stated that journalists of mainstream publications in Canada often conflate "fundamentalist" Sikhism with the pro-Khalistan movement and "moderate" Sikhism with those opposed to the Khalistan movement; she explained that this occurred when the publications discussed religious conflicts in the Sikh community Vancouver as well as conflicts involving Sikhs throughout Canada. Nayar added that in Vancouver the wearing of turbans often is associated with Sikh fundamentalism.

Gora Sikhs (White Sikhs) are present in Greater Vancouver. Many have attempted to gain involvement with Punjabi Sikhs. Nayar, in The Sikh Diaspora in Vancouver: Three Generations Amid Tradition, Modernity, and Multiculturalism, wrote that "For the most part, the Gora Sikh community functions separately from the Punjabi Sikh community." Some Gora Sikhs have criticized a focus on Indian politics and the factionalism within Punjabi Sikh gurdwaras.

Gurdwaras
Sikh gurdwaras (Sikh temples) in Vancouver were the city's only community centres for the Indo-Canadians until the 1960s. This meant that the gurdwaras at the time also gave social outlets to Punjabi Hindus and other South Asians. By 1981, gurdwaras mainly filled religious purposes. Many major gurdwaras in Greater Vancouver were initially established in isolated areas, but these areas over time became urbanized.

Sikhs often selected gurdwaras due to religious beliefs, family ties, political beliefs, and/or social reasons, and these were not necessarily gurdwaras that were the closest to them.

By 1988 there were six gurdwaras within a  radius in one area in Vancouver. Four new gurdwaras opened in Metro Vancouver in the 1980s.

Gurdwaras in Vancouver
The first gurdwara in Vancouver opened in 1908. It was founded by the Khalsa Diwan Society (KDS), which was established in 1906, This gurdwara was originally on West 2nd Avenue. making it Vancouver's oldest Sikh Society. In 1969 it moved to the intersection of Southwest Marine Drive and Ross Street, in South Vancouver.

The Akali Singh Gurdwara is in East Vancouver, along Skeena Street. It opened in 1952 in response to a religious dispute. Around the time it opened, the Akali Singh Gurdwara did not permit people who had no facial hair from being a part of its management committee, but it allowed them to be a part of the auditing committee and some of the individuals who gave significant amounts of money to the gurdwara were clean-shaven. The construction of the current gurdwara, valued at 1.5-2 million dollars, began construction in 1981. Previously the revenue of the Akali Singh gurdwara was equal to that of the KDS, but around the time of the new gurdwara construction, a takeover of the gurdwara was attempted. The gurdwara prevented an internal takeover by restricting election participation to persons who were not members of other Sikh societies. As a result, a severe membership split occurred and the size was reduced. The Akali Singh was opposed to the KDS, which had a more militant attitude towards the Khalistan question.

Around 1975 a Marxist–Leninist Sikh group purchased the Desh Baghat Mandir centre on Main Street after a failed attempt to seize control of other gurdwaras.

Gurdwaras in suburbs
Most South Asians in Surrey, as of 2001, are Sikhs. The Guru Nanak Sikh Gurdwara is on Scott Road in the City of Surrey. As of 2011 in regards to its orthodoxy it is a "moderate" gurdwara. As of 2004 it had 37,000 members, making it one of North America's largest Sikh temples.

The Guru Nanak Sikh Gurdwara was established in North Delta in 1973 by the Guru Nanak Sikh Society in order to serve the around 200 Sikh families living in the Surrey-Delta area. The society itself, the Guru Nanak Sikh Temple Society of Delta Surrey, opened that year. The current facility opened in 1981 along Scott Road in Surrey. Due to opposition to the gurdwara from non-Sikhs in Delta, the Delta city government asked the Guru Nanakh Sikh Society to build the new gurdwara in the Surrey side of a property that had been purchased by the society in 1973. In exchange the Delta city government gave access to the Delta sewage system. As of 1988 it was largest Greater Vancouver gurdwara building. The gurdwara was receiving a level income slightly below those of the two largest Vancouver-area gurdwaras by 1979. Around 1984 the International Sikh Youth Federation (ISYF) took control of the Guru Nanakh Gurdwara. The ISYF was a daughter organization of the World Sikh Organization (WSO), which controlled the KDS.  According to Hugh Johnston, as of 1988 the gurdwara "probably" had the second largest membership in Greater Vancouver, after the KDS. In January 1998 a coalition of anti-ISYF Sikhs and Sikhs who favored the Indian Congress wrested power away from the ISYF.

The KDS had its own branch gurdwara in New Westminster. In 1974 the New Westminster Khalsa Diwan became its own Sikh society. Hugh Johnston stated that in the 1970s the KDS New Westminster had a "sizeable income".

Dasmesh Darbar Gurdwara is an orthodox gurdwara in Surrey.

The gurdwara of the New Westminster Society is in Richmond. The previous membership followed Baba Mihan Singh, an individual from Doaba who had been invited to attend the New Westminster Society after he arrived in Vancouver; the New Westminster Society had employed one of his relatives as a priest. In 1979 the Nananksar Gurdwara, established by followers of Baba Mihan Singh, was being established, sapping membership from the New Westminster Society. As of 1989, the group controlling the KDS also controlled the New Westminster Society. Since 1984 the Nanaksar Gurdwara attracted Sikhs who were uninterested in politics.

There is a dalit gurdwara in Burnaby, the Shri Guru Ravidass Sabha Temple. It opened in 1982. As of 2008 there were 900 members. Two Jats filed a complaint with the British Columbia Human Rights Tribunal after they were denied membership, but the tribunal ruled that the gurdwara was minority-serving and had the right to reject the Jats.

See also
List of Canadian Sikhs
Sikhism in Canada
 Indo-Canadians in Greater Vancouver

References
 Campbell, Michael Graeme. 1977. The Sikhs of Vancouver: A Case Study in Minority-Host Relations (M.A. thesis) (Archive), Political Science Department, University of British Columbia, Vancouver. Profile at the UBC
 Dusenbery, Verne A. 1981. "Canadian Ideology and Public Policy: The Impact on Vancouver Sikh Ethnic and Religious Adaptation". In Canadian Ethnic Studies, Vol. 13: 3, Winter. 
 Hans, Raj Kumar. 2003. "Gurdwara as a Cultural Site of Punjabi Community in British Columbia, 1905 – 1965." In Fractured Identity: The Indian Diaspora in Canada, Sushma J. Varma & Radhika Seshan (eds.). Jaipur: Rawat Publications. 
 Johnston, Hugh. 1988. "The Development of Punjabi Community in Vancouver since 1961". In Canadian Ethnic Studies, Vol. 20:2.
 Nayar, Kamala Elizabeth. The Sikh Diaspora in Vancouver: Three Generations Amid Tradition, Modernity, and Multiculturalism. University of Toronto Press, 2004. , 9780802086310.
 Nayar, Kamala Elizabeth. "The Making of Sikh Space: The Role of the Gurdwara" (Chapter 2). In: DeVries, Larry, Don Baker, and Dan Overmyer. Asian Religions in British Columbia (Asian Religions and Society Series). UBC Press, January 1, 2011. , 9780774859424. Start: p. 43.
 Nayar, Kamala Elizabeth, "Misunderstood in the Diaspora: The Experience of Orthodox Sikhs in Vancouver." Sikh Formations 4, No. 1 2008), p. 17-32. -

Notes

Further reading
 Walton-Roberts, Margaret. 1998. "Three Readings of the Turban: Sikh Identity in Greater Vancouver" (Archive). In Urban Geography, Vol. 19: 4, June. - DOI 10.2747/0272-3638.19.4.311 - Available at Academia.edu and at ResearchGate.

Sikhism in Canada
Culture of Vancouver